Cytospora is a genus of ascomycete fungi. The genus was first described in 1818 by Christian Gottfried Ehrenberg. Cytospora species are known as plant pathogens.

Pathology
Cytospora canker was observed by G. B. Ouellette in all the plantations of white and Norway spruces examined in the Province of Quebec, as well as in some natural stands of indigenous spruce. Disease incidence was particularly high in the Grand-Mère and Saint-Lazare plantations where it had been present since at least 1943 and 1955, respectively. Periods favourable to infection had occurred at fairly regular intervals, and the aggressiveness of canker development varied year by year. Rainfall, temperature, and disease intensity were not clearly correlated.

References

External links 
 Index Fungorum
 

Fungal plant pathogens and diseases
Diaporthales
Sordariomycetes genera
Taxa named by Christian Gottfried Ehrenberg